Ayesha-Michelle Ray (born 24 September 1991) is an English professional wrestler, entertainer, actress and stunt actress known by her ring names and stage names Ayesha Raymond and Amazon. She is known mainly for her work in World Wonder Ring Stardom, Seadlinnng, WOS (World of Sport ITV), WWE and is the current Owner and Lead Coach at Renegade Wrestling Dojo (Scotland) formally The Fierce Females Dojo.
Also credited and featured in Warner Bros DC Universe Pennyworth as 'Mad Janet Murphy'. Raymond is currently signed to Japanese wrestling promotion SEAdLINNNG as of May 2022 as their first international permanent member.

Professional wrestling career

Ayesha Raymond can trade wrestling wristlocks and toeholds with the best of them, but at heart, she’s a girl from the East End of London who loves to brawl. Raymond has been a trained fighter since the age of 15 and is an accomplished bodybuilder, so her grit and brawn aren’t in question. She knew her calling was in the ring when she was young and would play-wrestle with her brothers. Now she’s all grown up, a 6-foot-tall, self-described Amazon towering over the competition. Raymond sharpened by the teachings of British greats like Johnny Saint, Tony Scarlo and WWE Performance Center coach Robbie Brookside, and this summer, she looks to conquer a new frontier in the Mae Young Classic.

Championships and accomplishments
German Wrestling Federation
GWF Women's Championship (1 time)
International Pro Wrestling: United Kingdom
IPW:UK Tag Team Championship (1 time) – with Paul Robinson, Will Ospreay and Scott Wainwright
IPW:UK Women's Championship (1 time)
Premier Promotions
PWF Ladies Championship (1 time, current)
PWF Ladies Tag Team Championship (1 time) – with Destiny
Reckless Intent Wrestling
Reckless Intent Hardcore Champion (1 time)
World Wonder Ring Stardom
Artist of Stardom Championship (1 time) – with Alpha Female and Kyoko Kimura
Ultimate Pro Wrestling
UPW Women's Championship (1 time and current)
WrestleForce
WrestleForce Women's Championship (1 time)
World War Wrestling
WWW Women's Championship (1 time)
ROE GLAM Austria 
Women's Champion (1 time and current)
Scottish Wrestling Entertainment
Empress Women's Championship (1 Time and current)

References

External links

1989 births
Living people
English female professional wrestlers
Sportspeople from London
Black British sportswomen
21st-century professional wrestlers
Artist of Stardom Champions